The Notting Hillbillies were a country rock project formed by British singer-songwriter Mark Knopfler in May 1986. The group consisted of Knopfler (guitar and vocals), Steve Phillips (guitar and vocals), Brendan Croker (guitar and vocals), Guy Fletcher (keyboards and vocals), Paul Franklin (pedal steel), Marcus Cliffe (bass), and Ed Bicknell (drums). They gave their first performance at a small club in Leeds, and followed up with a tour.

The Notting Hillbillies recorded just one album, Missing...Presumed Having a Good Time, released on Vertigo in the UK (Warner Bros. in the US) in 1990, before members returned to concentrate on their primary musical outlets. Three tracks from the album –  "Your Own Sweet Way", "Feel Like Going Home" and "Will You Miss Me" – were released as singles; some versions of these included "Lonesome Wind Blues", a track not on the album. The Notting Hillbillies reunited several times for charity gigs. In May 1997 the Hillbillies went on an 11 show tour in the UK.

The Town & Country Club in Leeds on 3 July 1993 only featured the Knopfler-Croker-Philips trio. The set list included the only known live performances of two Dire Straits songs : "Ticket To Heaven" and "How Long". The Notting Hillbillies had previously performed "When It Comes to You" in 1990, before it was actually recorded and issued by Dire Straits on their final album On Every Street, in 1991.  At the height of their fame, the Notting Hillbillies were the musical guest on the 19 May 1990 episode of Saturday Night Live, hosted by Candice Bergen.

The concert at The City Hall in Newcastle on 6 July 1993 featured Alan Clark on keyboards, his only appearance with the band. Ed Bicknell and Marcus Cliffe were also present. This was the last time that Clark played with Knopfler within a full band.

In 1993, two shows were performed, both without Guy Fletcher.

Band line-up members
 Mark Knopfler – guitar, vocals
 Steve Phillips – guitar, vocals
 Brendan Croker – guitar, vocals
 Guy Fletcher – keyboards, vocals
 Paul Franklin – pedal steel (studio album and 1990 tour only)
 Marcus Cliffe – bass
 Ed Bicknell – drums (replaced by Danny Cummings for the four 2002 shows)

Discography

Studio albums

Singles

References

British folk music groups
British country rock musical groups
Dire Straits
Vertigo Records artists